In field theory, a branch of algebra, a field extension  is said to be regular if k is algebraically closed in L  (i.e.,  where  is the set of elements in L algebraic over k) and L is separable over k, or equivalently,  is an integral domain when  is the algebraic closure of  (that is, to say,  are linearly disjoint over k).

Properties
 Regularity is transitive: if F/E and E/K are regular then so is F/K.
 If F/K is regular then so is E/K for any E between F and K.
 The extension L/k is regular if and only if every subfield of L finitely generated over k is regular over k.
 Any extension of an algebraically closed field is regular.
 An extension is regular if and only if it is separable and primary.
 A purely transcendental extension of a field is regular.

Self-regular extension
There is also a similar notion: a field extension  is said to be self-regular if  is an integral domain. A self-regular extension is relatively algebraically closed in k.  However, a self-regular extension is not necessarily regular.

References

 
 M. Nagata (1985). Commutative field theory: new edition, Shokado. (Japanese) 
 
 A. Weil, Foundations of algebraic geometry.

Field (mathematics)